Mads Albæk (born 14 January 1990) is a Danish professional footballer who plays as a midfielder for SønderjyskE. He has also represented the Danish national under-21 team.

Youth career
Born in Roskilde, Albæk began his footballing career started in the small Zealandic club, Gadstrup IF. At the age of 11, he moved to play for Herfølge Boldklub. When playing for Herfølge's youth team, Albæk was on trial at SC Heerenveen from the Netherlands, and later on, he was tested by Tottenham Hotspur from England. His talent was discovered by the Danish Superliga club FC Midtjylland, who brought Albæk through the ranks of their youth academy.

Club career

FC Midtjylland
Albæk signed his first professional contract in January 2008, and was permanently promoted in the first team squad. However, he continued playing games for the U19 squad, while training with the first team. In the summer 2008, Albæk suffered from a twist in the knee and that resulted in an operation. Due to the injury, he debuted in February 2009 in a match against Esbjerg fB where he played the whole match. Albæk extended his contract in March 2010 until the summer 2014. He played 28 league matches in this season despite his young age.

Having established himself as a starter in the Midtjylland line-up, and he revealed in January 2013, that he would like to leave the club and take the step up. However, he wasn't sold in this transfer windows. Albæk was named as the player of the year 2012/13. With one year left of his contract, he left the club in the summer windows 2013.

Reims
Albæk had several interested club, but decided to join French side Stade de Reims in the summer of 2013.

He got his debut for the club on 17 August 2013. Albæk played the whole match and scored a goal in the 7th minute, helping his team win 2–1 against Lille. However, besides his good first match, the rest of the season wasn't so good. He didn't fit in and did only score two goals in 27 league matches.

Albæk suffered from a stomach injury October 2014, that resulted in an operation in December that held him out for some months. He went back from this injury in April 2015.

IFK Göteborg
In August 2015, Albæk signed a two year-contract with Swedish team IFK Göteborg. He played his first match for the club only 5 days later against BK Häcken.

According to a Swedish media, IFK Göteborg rejected a bid from MLS-club Toronto FC for Albæk in January 2017.

International career
Albæk has played for various national youth sides, and he was rewarded with the Arla U17 youth prize.

Honours
SønderjyskE
Danish Cup: 2019–20

References

External links
 National team profile
 
 Official Danish Superliga stats

1990 births
Living people
People from Roskilde
Association football midfielders
Danish men's footballers
Denmark under-21 international footballers
Denmark youth international footballers
FC Midtjylland players
Stade de Reims players
IFK Göteborg players
SønderjyskE Fodbold players
Danish Superliga players
Ligue 1 players
Allsvenskan players
Danish expatriate men's footballers
Expatriate footballers in France
Expatriate footballers in Sweden
2. Bundesliga players
1. FC Kaiserslautern players
3. Liga players
Sportspeople from Region Zealand